Inder Iqbal Singh Atwal is an Indian politician and member of the Shiromani Akali Dal.

He was born to Charanjit Singh Atwal at Atwal, Amritsar, Punjab.

Atwal was a member of the Punjab Legislative Assembly from Kum Kalan Assembly constituency in Ludhiana district after winning 2002 Punjab Legislative Assembly election. He also unsuccessfully contested from the Raikot Assembly constituency.

References 

People from Ludhiana district
Shiromani Akali Dal politicians
Punjab, India MLAs 2002–2007
Living people
21st-century Indian politicians
Year of birth missing (living people)